The 2001 Décastar was the 24th edition of the annual two-day track and field meeting for combined track and field events. It took place on 15 September and 16 September 2001 in Talence, France. The competition, featuring a decathlon (men) and a heptathlon (women) event, was part of the 2001 IAAF World Combined Events Challenge.

Men's decathlon

Schedule

15 September

16 September

Results

Women's heptathlon

Schedule

15 September

September 16

Results

References
 decathlon2000
 Athletissimo decathlon results
 Athletissimo heptathlon results

2001
Decastar
Decastar
Decastar